Arthur Briggs may refer to:

 Arthur Briggs (musician) (1901–1991), African-American jazz trumpeter
 Arthur Briggs (rugby) (1867–1943), rugby union footballer of the 1890s for England, and Bradford F.C.
 Arthur E. Briggs (1881–1969), Los Angeles politician
 Arthur Briggs (footballer) (1900–1987), English footballer who played for Hull City, Tranmere Rovers and Swindon Town
 Arthur Briggs (Home and Away), a fictional character on the Australian soap opera Home and Away
 Arthur W. Briggs (1884–1949), American football, basketball, baseball and track and field coach